Wolfgang Gratzer (born 1965 in Bad Vöslau) is an Austrian musicologist.

From 2011 to 2014, he was involved in the management of the interuniversity doctoral program "Art and Public". From 2015 to 2018, he was in charge of the 3-year inter-university doctoral program "The Arts and its Public Impact". Concepts - Transfer - Resonance.

References

External links 
 Personal website
Current projects Homepage > Aktivitäten > Aktuelle Buch- und Veranstaltungsprojekte
 Website of the Institute for Musical History of Reception and Interpretation (University Mozarteum Salzburg)
 

1965 births
Living people
Austrian musicologists
University of Salzburg alumni